The Western Athletic Conference is a high school athletic league that is part of the CIF Southern Section.  It is an amalgamation of the Express League and the San Joaquin League (now the Santa Cruz League).

Members
Anaheim Discovery Christian School
 Avalon High School
 Bethel Baptist School
 Capistrano Valley Christian Schools
 Cornelia Connelly High School 
 Eastside Christian High School
 Emerson Honors School
 Fairmont Preparatory Academy 
 Liberty Christian School 
 LaVerne Lutheran High School
 Orangewood Academy 
 Saddleback Valley Christian Schools
 Shepherds Grove School
 Southlands Christian Schools
 St. Michael's Preparatory School
 Tarbut V' Torah (TVT) 
 The Webb Schools

References

CIF Southern Section leagues